Mauersberger may refer to persons:
Rudolf Mauersberger (1889–1971)   was a German choral conductor and composer.
Erhard Mauersberger (1903–1982) (brother of Rudolf)  was a German choral conductor.
Rainer Mauersberger (1957–) is a German astronomer.

Astronomical objects:
12782 Mauersberger is an asteroid.